Malta competed at the 1972 Summer Olympics in Munich, West Germany. Five competitors, all men, took part in two events in two sports.

Cycling

Four cyclists represented Malta in 1972.

Team time trial
 Louis Bezzina, John Magri, Joseph Said, and Alfred Tonna — 2:31:40.1 (31st place)

Shooting

Skeet
 Joseph Grech — 170 pts (55th place)

References

External links
Official Olympic Reports

Nations at the 1972 Summer Olympics
1972 Summer Olympics
1972 in Maltese sport